USS LST-353 was an  built for the United States Navy during World War II. It was destroyed on 21 May 1944 when an explosion on its deck sparked the West Loch Disaster in Pearl Harbor naval base.

Construction and service
LST-353 was laid down on 15 July 1942 at the Charleston Navy Yard; launched on 12 October 1942; sponsored by Mrs. Estelle Lynette Cushman; and commissioned on 27 November 1942. During World War II, LST-353 was assigned to the Asiatic-Pacific theater and participated in the following operations: the consolidation of the southern Solomons (June, 1943); the New Georgia-Rendova-Vangunu occupation (July, 1943); the Vella Lavella occupation (August, 1943); and the occupation and defense of Cape Torokina (November, 1943).

Loss

On 21 May 1944 she was sunk by internal explosion while moored in West Loch at Pearl Harbor, Hawaii and struck from the Naval Vessel Register on 18 July 1944.

Two others were severely damaged. In all 163 sailors were killed; 396 wounded.

LST-353 earned three battle stars and the Navy Unit Commendation for World War II service.

See also
 List of United States Navy LSTs
 List of United States Navy losses in World War II

References

 
 

World War II amphibious warfare vessels of the United States
Ships built in Charleston, South Carolina
1942 ships
LST-1-class tank landing ships of the United States Navy
Ships sunk by non-combat internal explosions
Maritime incidents in May 1944
Shipwrecks of Hawaii